Arthur Bezer (20 October 1875 – 11 July 1944) was an English cricketer. He was a left-arm bowler who played for Somerset. He was born and died in Bath.

Bezer made his only first-class appearance during the 1914 season, playing against Hampshire. He scored a duck in the first innings and just one run in the second innings of a match which Somerset lost by a margin of an innings and 192 runs. Bezer bowled two overs during the match, conceding twelve runs.

He worked as the groundsman at Bath Cricket Club.

References

External links
Arthur Bezer at Cricket Archive 

1875 births
1944 deaths
English cricketers
Somerset cricketers
Sportspeople from Bath, Somerset